Antwerp Edgar Pratt FRGS (6 March 1852 - 4 January 1924) was a Victorian naturalist, explorer, author, and renowned collector of plants, insects, and other animals. Species named for Pratt include three mammals and two reptiles. Two of his sons and a nephew were also collectors.

Biography
Pratt was born on 6 March 1852 on the Isle of Wight in England to Charles, a grocer, and Ann Pratt. He had two elder siblings, Florence and Vienna.

He married Alice Mary Spanner in 1882 and they had six children, four sons and two daughters. Felix Pratt and Charles Pratt followed their father and became successful insect collectors. His other sons Henry and Joseph also made important contributions to science.

He was a member of the Royal Geographical Society and in 1891 he received the Gill Memorial Award for the encouragement of geographical research in early career researchers who have shown great potential. In the same year he visited Tibet and China. In China his activities were treated with suspicion and notices were posted warning locals of assisting him. He made some progress by employing Chinese Christians. These employees were harassed by the locals and his German assistant had to retreat from his work. Whilst he was in Tatsienlu in China he met and was assisted by the French missionaries and naturalists Bishop Felix Biet and Father Jean André Soulié.

In 1892 he published an account of his journey "to the snows of Tibet through China". This book is thought to show that Pratt did not actually get to Tibet but he only got close enough to meet the missionaries who had been ejected from the country. Incidentally Pratt's book is thought to be a source for the work of Vladimir Nabokov.

He died in 1924 in Kingston upon Thames, Surrey, aged 71.

Expeditions

A.E. Pratt, 1906. Introduction to Two Years among New Guinea Cannibals.

Benefactors
Antwerp Edgar Pratt and his sons travelled and collected specimens on behalf of a number of prominent people including the English entomologists John Henry Leech, Sir George Hamilton Kenrick and James John Joicey as well as Walter Rothschild, 2nd Baron Rothschild.

Collections
Birmingham Museums Trust holds substantial natural history collections gathered by A. E. Pratt and his sons.

Species named after Pratt
 Pratt's roundleaf bat Hipposiderous pratti, 1891
 Pratt's vole (Alt. the Sichuan Red-backed Vole) Eothenomys chinensis, 1891
 Pratt's crabapple Malus prattii 1895
 Pratt's snail eater Dipsas pratti, 1897
 Pratt's rocket frog Colostethus pratti, 1899
 Sphenomorphus pratti, 1903
 Pratt's tree frog Litoria pratti, 1911
 Green acouchi Myoprocta pratti, 1913
 Ceram bandicoot Rhynchomeles prattorum, 1920 (Named for his sons)

 Buru opalescent birdwing butterfly Troides prattorum, 1922
 Delias pratti, 1922

Publications
Pratt, A.E. (1892). To the Snows of Tibet through China. London: Longmans.
Pratt, A.E. (1906). Two Years among New Guinea Cannibals, a Naturalists Sojourn among the Aborigines of Unexplored New Guinea. London: Seeley & Co.

References

External links
Joicey J, Talbot G (1924). The Bulletin of the Hill Museum. Volume 1. 1921-1924. London: John Bale & Sons.

1852 births
1920 deaths
People from the Isle of Wight
English naturalists
Fellows of the Royal Geographical Society